The Albany Convention was an independent governing body led by local civil and military officials centred on Albany, New York, during Leisler's Rebellion.

When news of the Glorious Revolution reached the Province of New York in 1689, Jacob Leisler led a rebellion in which he appointed himself ruler of the Province of New York. Albany was the only centre which resisted Leisler's claims to leadership.  Under the leadership of Peter Schuyler and Robert Livingston the Albany Convention was formed which remained loyal to William and Mary. Leisler's year-long attempt to subdue the Albany Convention led to a number of military engagements.

History of Albany, New York
Pre-statehood history of New York (state)